is the second single of the J-pop singer Aya Matsuura, who was a Hello! Project solo artist at the time. It was released on June 13, 2001 under the Zetima label. It was also re-recorded in 2006 for her "Naked Songs" album. This album included arrangements with a Studio Brass Section and more acoustic rhythm section.

Track listing 
All lyrics are written by Tsunku.
 
 
 "Tropical Koishiteru" (Instrumental)

External links 
 Tropical Koishiteru entry on the Up-Front Works official website

Aya Matsuura songs
Zetima Records singles
2001 singles
Songs written by Tsunku
2001 songs